The Khasi Hills bent-toed gecko (Cyrtodactylus khasiensis) is a species of gecko found in Asia.

Distribution
North-eastern Bangladesh, India (Assam, Darjeeling, Khasi Hills), N Burma (Pangnamdim), Bhutan
Race tamaiensis: "Upper Burma" (fide WERMUTH 1965); Type locality: Pangnamdim, Nam Tamai Valley, Upper  Myanmar.
Type locality: Khasi Hills, Assam.

References
 Annandale, N. 1906 A new gecko from the eastern Himalayas. Journal and Proceedings of the Asiatic Society of Bengal, 2:287-288
 Boulenger, G.A. 1885 Catalogue of the Lizards in the British Museum (Nat. Hist.) I. Geckonidae, Eublepharidae, Uroplatidae, Pygopodidae, Agamidae. London: 450 pp.
 Das, I. & Palden, J. 2000 A herpetological collection from Bhutan, with new country records. Herpetological Review 31 (4): 256-258
 Jerdon, T.C. 1870 Notes on Indian Herpetology. P. Asiatic Soc. Bengal March 1870: 66-85

External links
 

Cyrtodactylus
Reptiles described in 1870